The 31st Academy of Country Music Awards was held on April 24, 1996, at the Universal Amphitheatre, in Los Angeles, California . The ceremony was hosted by Faith Hill and Brooks & Dunn.

Winners and nominees 
Winners are shown in bold.

References 

Academy of Country Music Awards
1996 in American music
Academy of Country Music Awards
Academy of Country Music Awards
Academy of Country Music Awards
Academy of Country Music Awards